Souhegan Cooperative High School is a Coalition of Essential Schools high school located in Amherst, New Hampshire, in the United States. Students from Amherst and Mont Vernon attend Souhegan for 9th through 12th grades. There are about 750 students. The school was founded based on the work of Theodore R. Sizer, a former dean of the Harvard Graduate School of Education, a notable American education reform leader and the father of the Essential Schools movement. Notably, Souhegan's progressive reputation has been chronicled in the book Standards of Mind and Heart: Creating the Good High School by Tony Wagner, Peggy Silvia and Dr. Robert A. Mackin (Teachers College Press, 2002). Based on this history, the school was founded with the mission "Souhegan High School aspires to be a community of learners born of respect, trust and courage." The school name is derived from its proximity to the Souhegan River, which adjoins the school property. The word Souhegan comes from the Algonquin language, meaning "waiting and watching place".

History

Authorized Regional Enrollment Area
The town of Amherst had long sought to apply economies of scale through a cooperative high school in partnership with adjoining towns and made several overtures in the late 1950s and early 1960s to neighboring Milford and other towns, but found no support. A proposal for a cooperative district with Bedford came to a vote in 1961, passing overwhelmingly in Amherst, but being defeated in Bedford. In November 1964, Amherst and Milford entered into the state's first Authorized Regional Enrollment Area (or "AREA") agreement, a long-term tuition agreement under which Milford would retain ownership and absolute control of the high school and Amherst would pay tuition to Milford based upon Milford's per-pupil costs of the preceding year, plus a share of the school's capital debt, but had no voice in the school's governance; the agreement was irrevocable while the debt was carried. Mont Vernon joined the AREA agreement and additionally sent its middle school students to Milford. Amherst was dissatisfied with the high school and its lack of voice, and "Milford felt that Amherst had educational ideas too rich for Milford's blood." The school boards of Amherst and Milford tentatively planned in 1976 not to renew the AREA agreement in ten years' time when the high school's capital debt was anticipated to be paid off. The Amherst School District appointed a committee to examine the alternatives, including building a high school of its own. The committee commissioned a study by an architectural and educational planning firm, which was published in 1982.

Beginning in 1984, Amherst and Mont Vernon were each permitted to send one non-voting delegate to the Milford School Board, as was the high school's student body. Despite the tentative plan from nine years earlier for the towns' school districts to go their separate ways, negotiations for a prospective new AREA agreement began in 1985 with Amherst and Mont Vernon seeking significant improvements to the high school. The debt and the AREA agreement expired as expected at the end of the 1985–1986 academic year while negotiations continued; its tuition terms continued under annual tuition agreements in the interim.

Cooperative High School era
A regional school district was proposed and put before the voters of all three towns in 1988. The proposal was defeated at the Milford School District's special deliberative session. Days later, the Amherst School District held its special deliberative session where Amherst voters established the Souhegan Cooperative School District. Mont Vernon followed suit within the week.

The school opened in 1992, on property previously owned by the Amherst School District, adjoining the Amherst Middle School and sharing some outdoor facilities. The school added a second building in 2003, called the Annex.

The school is part of the SAU-39 school district, which includes the middle and elementary schools in Amherst and Mont Vernon.

The current principal of the high school is Michael Berry.

Recognition
In June 2009 Souhegan was listed #15 in "The Top of the Class", a ranking of the top 1,564 public high schools in the United States (approximately the top 6%) by Newsweek.

In April 2016, officials from the U.S. Department of Education toured the school and met with students and staff to discuss Souhegan's involvement with P.A.C.E. (Performance Assessment of Competency Education), Competency Based Education and Deeper Learning initiatives.

Souhegan consistently ranks as one of the best public high schools in New Hampshire:
 #7 Overall in New Hampshire, U.S. News & World Report (2018).
#4 Overall in New Hampshire, Niche (2017).
 #8 Overall in New Hampshire, SchoolDigger (2017).
 #9 College Readiness in New Hampshire, U.S. News & World Report (2017).
 Top Public High School for Student Athletes in New Hampshire, Niche (2017).

Academics

Program of studies 
Souhegan's program of studies is extensive. School practices and decision-making at Souhegan High School are research-based and rooted in the tenets of their guiding documents. The tenets include Souhegan's mission statement, Coalition of Essential Schools Ten Common Principles, Academic Learner Expectations, and the Souhegan Six.

Academic foundations

Souhegan offers core academic programs in the following areas: Humanities, English, Social Studies, Mathematics, Science, World Languages, Classical Languages, Fine Arts, Performing Arts, Technology, Computer Science, Media Arts, Wellness and Health, Family and Consumer Science, and Business Education. The school also has multiple partnerships to provide Career and Technical opportunities..

Honors and Advanced Placement

Within most classes, an Honors Challenge option is offered to students who wish to pursue advanced academic studies. Honors Challenge guidelines are established school-wide; Honors Challenge expectations per course are developed by individual teachers. Credit for honors is earned by fulfilling the expectations. Honors is identified on the student's end of year report card and transcript with an ‘H.’ Students who are engaged in honors will also have the course identified with an HP (Honors Pending) on their transcript at trimester one.

Advanced Placement (AP): Advanced Placement courses are offered in the following subjects: 
 AP English Literature
 AP English Language Composition
 AP Human Geography
 AP US History
 AP Statistics
 AP Calculus AB
 AP Calculus BC
 AP Chemistry
 AP Physics C
 AP Environmental Science
 AP French
 AP Spanish
 AP Studio Art
 AP Computer Science A
 AP Computer Science Principles
Academic Learner Expectations

ALE's are part of the evaluation of all student work, consistent with the school's commitment to developing 21st Century skills. These expectations consist of: 
 Knowledgeable Person
 Complex Thinker
 Skilled Information Processor/Consumer
 Effective Communicator/Producer
 Self-Directed Learner
 Collaborative Worker
 Responsible Citizen
Grading based on these Learner Expectations is on a scale of "Does Not Meet", "Approaches", "Meets", and "Exceeds". These grades correlate to "F", "C", "B", and "A" on a traditional grading scale, respectively. Souhegan does not include "D" in the grading scale, any grade that would be a "D" is automatically an "F" or "NC" (No Credit).

Unique programs

The four traditional grade levels at Souhegan are split in two. Division One consists of Freshman and Sophomore year. Division Two consists of Junior and Senior year. The following project-based programs are core academic requirements:

Division I Exhibition 
The Division I Exhibition is designed to help students recognize and acknowledge their progress in the Souhegan High School Academic Learner Expectations and the Mission Statement. It is a multipart process for sophomore students moving into their junior year. The first part of the process is for a student to complete a portfolio of 9th and 10th grade work, reacting on this work through the lens of the learner expectations. Next, using the information in the portfolio, students write a reaction on their entire Division I (9th and 10th grade) experience. The final part of the process is the exhibition, students participate in the form of a 45-minute "roundtable" where the student presents his/her portfolio and written reaction in the company of his/her advisor, parents, peers and a second Souhegan staff member. The Division I Exhibition is a graduation requirement. Students who do not successfully complete the Division I Exhibition will work with their advisor and counselor to develop a plan for meeting this requirement.

Junior Research Project 
The Junior Research Project, a graduation requirement, is a researched writing process that culminates with a comprehensive research paper written in the spring of the junior year. As part of the World Studies curriculum, students gain research and writing skills that aid them in the completion of this paper. In their final product students exhibit their competence in the Academic Learner Expectations. The Junior Research Project is a graduation requirement.

Post-graduate plan 
All juniors will complete post-secondary planning to include elements of critical life skills such as decision- making, college, and career planning. Juniors will also complete a college search, a resume, transcript audit, and review the common application. The PGP exposes students to the skills and knowledge necessary to pursue a variety of post-secondary options.

Senior project 
Senior Project is a personalized learning experience which is a requirement for graduation from Souhegan High School. With support from a faculty mentor, students identify an area of passion, complete significant research, apply their research to an original project, and prepare a formal twenty minute presentation. Throughout the senior project, students demonstrate their skills as independent learners including their ability to problem-solve, organize their time and resources, and reflect upon their learning. Senior project embodies all of Souhegan's Learner Expectation; these skills contribute to life-long learning.

Governance 

Governance at Souhegan is unique to other public high schools. Given inclusion and student-voice are critical cultural components at the school, governance includes not only Administration and the Souhegan Cooperative School Board, but also a Community Council. Community Council was founded in 1992 during Souhegan's first year of service. Its task is to create and modify school procedure as a representative body of forty-seven members. Council is purposefully diverse and purposefully student led. The representatives discuss and vote on various proposals concerning student life, school initiatives, disciplinary procedure, grading procedure, and any other matter of importance to the school community.

Community Council 
Community Council is the main governing body of Souhegan. The Community Council has the power to create and change Souhegan's policies, including but not limited to:
 Grading
 Scheduling
 Discipline
 All other issues of importance to the community
All of Community Council's power is derived from the Souhegan Cooperative School Board, rather than the school's administrators, which has the power to override any decision made by the Community Council. Community Council consists of parents, external community members, students, teachers, and administrative faculty, although all community members are encouraged to be a part of the discussions. Community Council meets directly after school once each week, except for one night a month when the meeting takes place at night. The Community Council consists of:
 9th Grade Representatives (5)
 10th Grade Representatives (5)
 11th Grade Representatives (5)
 12th Grade Representatives (5)
 Faculty/Staff Representatives (10)
 Dean of Students (1)
 Community Representatives (5)
 School Board Liaison (1)
 At-Large Representatives (10)

Community Review Board
The Community Review Board is a body of community members that was created to ensure the fairness of disciplinary actions by the school's administration. The Community Review Board only has authority in cases which do not involve outside agencies, such as the police. The Community Review Board consists of eleven members including:
 One student elected from each grade
 One student selected by random, voluntary lottery
 Two elected faculty
 One elected Community Council member

The Community Review Board has the authority to:
 Decide whether or not to hear a case
 Uphold the administration's decision
 Change the punishment set by the administration
 Nullify the administration's decision
In cases where the police department is involved, a student can appeal to the principal, superintendent, and then the school board. In cases where the school chooses not to pursue legal action, a student may still appeal to the CRB.

Souhegan Cooperative School Board 
The Souhegan Cooperative School Board is a seven-member board that consists of five elected members serving Amherst, New Hampshire and two elected members serving Mont Vernon, New Hampshire. Different seats have terms of either two or three years, depending on the seat.  Elections are held every year in March.

Athletics and clubs

Athletics

The Souhegan Sabers compete across several divisions in the New Hampshire Interscholastic Athletic Association. The Sabers field 27 different girls, boys and co-ed athletic teams.
 The girls' soccer team set a state record by winning 9 straight Class I championships between 1992 and 2000.
 In 2003 the school set a state record with eight teams winning state championships.  The softball, boys' baseball, boys' basketball, boys' track, boys' and girls' tennis and the girls' and boys' lacrosse teams all won state championships.
 The varsity ice hockey team won the NHIAA DIII state championships in 2006, 2007, 2008, and 2014.
 The varsity football team won the NHIAA DIII state championships in 2004, 2008, 2009, 2010 and 2020.
 In 2012, the boys' varsity indoor track, outdoor track, and cross country teams won DII state championship titles.
In 2016, the girls' varsity cross country team was the first in school history to win the DII championship title. They also went on to win the New Hampshire Meet of Champions and earn runner-up honors at the New England Championships. The varsity girls team also placed 2nd as the Sabers Running Club at the non-NHIAA sanctioned Nike Northeast qualifier in Wappinger Falls, NY, and became only the third team from New Hampshire to qualify to compete at Nike Cross Nationals (formerly Nike Team Nationals).
 In 2017, the girls' varsity indoor track and field team won the DII state championship.
 In 2017, the girls' varsity lacrosse team won the DI state championship.  Lacrosse is the only NHIAA sport Souhegan competes in at the DI level for both girls and boys programs.

Clubs
The Claw: Souhegan High School's digital magazine. Their website states, "we are a group of talented authors, journalists, photographers, cinematographers, and athletes dedicating our extracurricular time to celebrate the unique passions, interests, and intentions of our student body. We promise to report the truth: With sincerity. With accuracy. With integrity. And without bias."

In the 2016–2017 academic year, the school offered 47 different clubs and activities.

Notable alumni and staff 
Courtney Banghart (class of 1995), head women's basketball coach at Princeton University
 Tony Labranche (class of 2020), Youngest New Hampshire State Representative in state history.
 Staff Sergeant Ryan M. Pitts (class of 2003), Medal of Honor recipient
 Alex Preston, finalist on American Idol (season 13)

Campus 

 Main Building
 Annex
 Calvetti Field & Athletic Complex
 Theater
 Music Wing

References

External links

 
 Coalition of Essential Schools
 One School Street Online Magazine
 Official SAU39 website
 The Claw student news site
 Sabers Football website

Educational institutions established in 1992
Schools in Hillsborough County, New Hampshire
Public high schools in New Hampshire
Amherst, New Hampshire
1992 establishments in New Hampshire